Ballat (also spelled Blat) is a village in northern Syria located west of Homs in the Homs Governorate. According to the Syria Central Bureau of Statistics, Ballat had a population of 574 in the 2004 census. Its inhabitants are predominantly Greek Orthodox Christians. The village has a Greek Orthodox Church.

References

Bibliography

 

Populated places in Talkalakh District
Eastern Orthodox Christian communities in Syria
Christian communities in Syria